Chonas may refer to:
 Colossae, an ancient city of Phrygia
 Chonas, Iran, a village in Markazi Province, Iran